The splendid partulina, scientific name Partulina splendida, is a species of tropical air-breathing land snail, a terrestrial pulmonate gastropod mollusk in the family Achatinellidae. This species is endemic to the United States.

References

Molluscs of the United States
Partulina
Gastropods described in 1853
Taxonomy articles created by Polbot